Giel Deferm (born 30 June 1988) is a Belgian footballer who plays as a left back, who plays for Thes Sport in the Belgian First Amateur Division.

External links
 Football Stats
 

Belgian footballers
1988 births
Living people
Belgian Pro League players
Challenger Pro League players
Sint-Truidense V.V. players
Beerschot A.C. players
Lommel S.K. players
Association football midfielders
K.V.V. Thes Sport Tessenderlo players
People from Sint-Truiden
Footballers from Limburg (Belgium)